HMS Archer was initially ordered as one of two Rifleman type gunvessels on 25 April 1846. With her construction suspended in September 1846, she was reordered on as a sloop on 25 April 1847 to be constructed to a design of John Edye as approved on 25 August. With the exception of two years on Baltic service during the Russian War of 1854 to 1855 she spent the majority on the West Coast of Africa on the anti-slavery patrol. This service involved anti-slavery work on the coasts of the Bight of Benin, and was notoriously unhealthy, with tropical diseases taking a heavy toll of British seamen. One of her commanders died and three others were invalided. Archer was reclassified as a corvette in 1862. She finally returned to Home waters, being sold for breaking in January 1866

Archer was the second named vessel since its introduction for a 12-gun gun brig launched by Perry at Blackwall on 2 April 1801 and sold on 14 December 1815.

Construction
She was laid down at Deptford Dockyard on 18 October 1847 and launched on 27 March 1849. She was completed for sea on 9 March 1850 at a cost of £41,404 (including hull of £20,785).

Commissioned Service

First Commission
Her first commission was on 2 April 1850 at Plymouth under Commander James N. Strange, RN for service with the West Africa Squadron performing anti-slaving patrols. By December 1852 she had returned to Home Waters and was assigned to Fishery Protection Squadron at Leith, Scotland. On 15 November 1853 she was paid off at Woolwich.

Second Commission
She recommissioned for service in the Baltic Sea during the war with Russia on 25 February 1854 under Captain Edmund Heathcote, RN. She returned to Home Waters in December 1855 then was assigned to the North America and West Indies Station by June 1856. She returned to pay off at Woolwich on 11 June 1857.

Third Commission
On 21 May 1858 she commissioned under Captain John Sanderson, RN for service on the West Coast of Africa. Captain Sanderson died in 1859 being replaced by Commander Richard W. Courtenay, RN on 17 August 1859. Captain Frederick A.B. Crauford, RN took command on 4 April 1860 when Commander Courtenay was invalided. This service involved anti-slavery work on the coasts of the Bight of Benin, and was notoriously unhealthy, with tropical diseases taking a heavy toll of British seamen. She returned to Home Waters and paid off at Woolwich on 5 October 1861.

Fourth Commission
Her last commission started on 30 March 1863 under Captain John Bythesea, RN for service on the West Coast of Africa. When Captain Bythesea became invalided, Captain Francis Marten, RN took command on 11 April 1864. During 1865 Archer was in action against Congo River Pirates. She returned to Home Waters at the end of 1865.

Disposition
Upon her arrival in Home Waters, she paid off at Woolwich on 30 January 1866. She was sold to Henry Castle & Sons, arriving at Charlton on 15 March 1866.

HMS Archer was awarded the Battle Honour Baltic 1854 – 55.

Archer was reclassified as a corvette in 1862, although her sister officially remained a sloop.

Notes

References

 Lyon Winfield, The Sail & Steam Navy List, All the Ships of the Royal Navy 1815 to 1889, by David Lyon & Rif Winfield, published by Chatham Publishing, London © 2004, 
 The Navy List, published by His Majesty's Stationery Office, London
 Winfield, British Warships in the Age of Sail (1817 – 1863), by Rif Winfield, published by Seaforth Publishing, England © 2014, e, Chapter 12 Screw Sloops, Vessels ordered or reordered as steam screw sloops (from 1845), Reynard
 Colledge, Ships of the Royal Navy, by J.J. Colledge, revised and updated by Lt Cdr Ben Warlow and Steve Bush, published by Seaforth Publishing, Barnsley, Great Britain, © 2020, e  (EPUB), Section A (Archer)

Victorian-era sloops of the United Kingdom
Sloops of the Royal Navy
Sloop classes